The 2021 Bucked Up 200 was the 3rd stock car race of the 2021 NASCAR Camping World Truck Series and the 25th iteration of the event. It was held on Friday, March 5, 2021 at Las Vegas Motor Speedway in North Las Vegas, Nevada. John Hunter Nemechek, driving for Kyle Busch Motorsports, would win the race leading 94 laps in a fierce battle with owner of Kyle Busch Motorsports, Kyle Busch, his first of the season and his 7th overall in the NASCAR Camping World Truck Series. Kyle Busch for Kyle Busch Motorsports and Austin Hill for Hattori Racing Enterprises would garner 2nd and 3rd, respectively.

The race is known for the start of CEO of Camping World Marcus Lemonis' challenge of sponsorship. The challenge would be that Marcus and Camping World would sponsor any unsponsored car, and give them a guaranteed $15,000. However, if the team got a Top 10, it would turn into $25,000, a Top 5 would earn $35,000, and a win would earn them $50,000. 10 teams would take up the sponsorship: The #2 of Sheldon Creed, The #3 of Jordan Anderson, the #6 of Norm Benning, the #9 of Grant Enfinger, the #24 of Raphaël Lessard, the #33 of Jesse Iwuji, the #34 of B. J. McLeod, the #41 of Dawson Cram, the #56 of Tyler Hill, and the #75 of Parker Kligerman. Only two would not get the minimum $15,000; Parker Kligerman who finished 8th, and Grant Enfinger who finished 7th, both earning $25,000.

Background

Starting lineup 
The field was set of a competition-based formula based on the previous race. As a result, Ben Rhodes of ThorSport Racing, who won the previous race, would achieve the pole.

Race results 
Stage 1 Laps: 30

Stage 2 Laps: 30

Stage 3 Laps: 74

References 

2021 NASCAR Camping World Truck Series
NASCAR races at Las Vegas Motor Speedway
Bucked Up 200
Bucked Up 200